Odra  is a village in Gmina Gorzyce, Wodzisław County, Silesian Voivodeship, Poland. It has a population of 391 (2006) and is situated on the Odra River.

It was first mentioned in a written document in 1185, in 1418 for the first under its current name.

External links 
  Information about village at Gmina Gorzyce website

Villages in Wodzisław County